Jordi Sánchez may refer to:

 Jordi Sánchez (actor) (born May 1964), Spanish actor and screenwriter
 Jordi Sànchez (politician) (born October 1964), Spanish politician
 Jordi Sánchez (footballer) (born 1994), Spanish association football player